Ric Steel is a Branson, Missouri-based singer and musician.

Early life
Born to traveling musicians, Ric (born 2 December 1952) hails from Jackson, Mississippi. At age 10, he began singing professionally as the lead in an operatic performance by Gian Carlo Menotti called "Amahl and the Night Visitors."

Musical career
Steel has had two Billboard charted singles, including "The Radio Song" at #57 and "Whose Baby Are You" at #59.

References

1952 births
American country guitarists
American male guitarists
American country singer-songwriters
American male singer-songwriters
Living people
Singer-songwriters from Mississippi
Musicians from Nashville, Tennessee
Musicians from Jackson, Mississippi
Luther Rice University alumni
Singer-songwriters from Tennessee
Guitarists from Mississippi
Guitarists from Tennessee
20th-century American guitarists
Country musicians from Tennessee
Country musicians from Mississippi
20th-century American male musicians